Luka camp was a concentration camp run by Bosnian Serb forces, in Brčko, Bosnia and Herzegovina, during the Bosnian War.

Background
Beginning in May 1992 until early July 1992, Serb forces held hundreds of Bosnian Muslims and Croats at the camp,  a warehouse facility on the Sava river, in inhumane conditions and under armed guard with detainees being systematically killed. Items were stolen from prisoners in Luka.

Trials
On 14 December 1999, Goran Jelisić was found guilty of having committed crimes against humanity and for violating the customs of war by the International Criminal Tribunal for the Former Yugoslavia was sentenced to 40 years imprisonment.

In October 2004, Rajko Češić pleaded guilty to having committed 10 murders and two cases of sexual assault at the camp and was sentenced to 18 years imprisonment. 

On 14 November 2011, Branko Pudić, a guard at camp, was indicted for having "exercised torture on a daily basis, inhumanely treated and inflicted sufferings to the civilian population at the camp".

On 21 December 2011, Monika Ilić, who is Goran Jelisić's wife, was detained on suspicion of having committed war crimes against non-Serbs at the camp. In 2013, she was found guilty of abusing inmates and sentenced to 4 years in prison. Monika's sentence was later reduced to 2.5 years, and she has since been released.

References

1992 establishments in Bosnia and Herzegovina
1992 disestablishments in Bosnia and Herzegovina
Serbian concentration camps in the Yugoslav Wars
Bosnian War internment camps
Serbian war crimes in the Bosnian War